The gray climbing mouse (Dendromus melanotis) is a species of rodent in the family Nesomyidae.
It is found in Angola, Benin, Botswana, Democratic Republic of the Congo, Ethiopia, Guinea, Liberia, Malawi, Mozambique, Namibia, Nigeria, Rwanda, South Africa, Eswatini, Tanzania, Uganda, Zambia, and Zimbabwe.
Its natural habitats are dry savanna, Mediterranean-type shrubby vegetation, subtropical or tropical dry lowland grassland, and temperate desert.

References

Sources

Dendromus
Rodents of Africa
Mammals described in 1834
Taxonomy articles created by Polbot